Holbein may refer to:

Holbein (surname)
Holbein, Saskatchewan, a small village in Canada
Holbein carpet, a type of Ottoman carpet
Holbein stitch, a type of embroidery stitch
 Holbein (crater), a crater on Mercury